Jagmeet is a given name of Indian origin. Notable people with the name include:

 Jagmeet Singh (born 1979), Canadian lawyer and politician
 Jagmeet Bal (born 1972), Indian music video director 
 Jagmeet Singh Brar (born 1958), Indian politician, lawyer, writer, and poet

Indian given names